Kornberg may refer to:

Places
 Kornberg (Gruibingen), a mountain in the district of Göppingen, Baden-Württemberg, Germany
 Kornberg (mountain), in the Fichtel Mountains of Bavaria, Germany
 Kornberg bei Riegersburg, a municipality in Styria, Austria
 Kornberg (Lichtenau im Waldviertel), Lichtenau im Waldviertel, a municipal division in Krems-Land District, Austria
 Kornberg (Neuhofen an der Ybbs), Neuhofen an der Ybbs, a municipal division in Amstetten District, Austria
 Schloss Kornberg, a castle near Riegersburg, Styria, Austria

Other uses 
 Kornberg (surname)

See also
 Kronberg (disambiguation)